Kevin Ara (born February 8, 1984) is an American soccer player, who played defensive midfielder for D.C. United.

Ara played his college soccer at Harvard University, where he had a rather distinguished career.  While at Harvard, he was named first team All-Ivy, first team All-New England and an NCAA All-American.  Ara was placed on the short list of finalists for the prestigious Herman Trophy during his senior season.

After graduating from Harvard, Ara was selected 24th overall in the 2004 MLS SuperDraft.  Ara managed to make an impact and earned significant playing time during his 2004 rookie season while winning a championship with D.C. United.

After the 2004 season, Ara was selected 18th overall by Real Salt Lake in the Expansion Draft.

After retiring from professional soccer, Ara started a career in finance and currently is a portfolio manager at a hedge fund.

References

References
 
 

1984 births
Living people
American soccer players
Jersey Shore Boca players
D.C. United players
Harvard Crimson men's soccer players
Harvard University alumni
D.C. United draft picks
Soccer players from California
USL League Two players
Major League Soccer players
Association football midfielders